Short Time is a 1990 American action comedy film directed by Gregg Champion. It stars Dabney Coleman, Matt Frewer and Teri Garr.

Synopsis
Seattle detective Burt Simpson (Dabney Coleman) is a man who is so concerned about planning for the future that he cannot enjoy the present. This strains his relationship with his wife Carolyn (Teri Garr) and young son Dougie (Kaj-Erik Eriksen). However, this is to change when a mix-up at the hospital (caused by a bus driver who is trying to hide his recent use of marijuana) makes him believe that he has two weeks to live. Finding out that his family will only receive a small amount of money from their life insurance policy if he dies of natural causes but will receive hundreds of thousands if he is killed in the line of duty, Burt sets out with the latter task.

Simpson's first effort centers around a domestic disturbance call. Aware that such affairs routinely turn violent, he eagerly responds, but it turns out to be an elderly couple. One of them misheard the other because they were deaf, and a kind remark was mistaken for an insult. When the error is revealed, the two happily reconcile. A more promising situation follows, when Simpson is involved in a car chase with some fleeing suspects - who happen to be the henchmen of local gun smuggler Carl Stark (Xander Berkeley). Simpson's vehicle and their car wind up demolished, but no lives are lost. Simpson is awarded a medal for his bravery.

Simpson then intervenes in a hostage situation involving a crazed man with a bomb where, due largely to his newfound realization of the importance of life, he is able to convince the bomber to give himself up. Accidentally forgetting to retrieve the bomb, however, the building is blown up and he is awarded another medal.

Between these events, Simpson spends what he believes are his final days, starting to live in the here and now. He buys a sports car, spends time with his son and reconciles with his wife. He also reveals to his partner Ernie Dills (Matt Frewer) his genuine respect and affection for him. The latter, mystified at this strange behavior, investigates of his own and discovers the mix-up, but by this time Simpson has gotten involved in a running shootout with the heavily armed Stark. The ensuing chase leads to both men hanging on balance via a window washer's scaffold on a skyscraper. Simpson's partner reveals to him that he is not going to die, but it is apparently too late: Stark falls to his death and Simpson falls after him.

The final scene occurs at the funeral for the bus driver, who has died of his condition. Simpson is suddenly revealed as attending - out of respect for the man who "gave me back my life". A photo in his partner's possession shows what had really happened: although Simpson did fall from the scaffold, his leg became entangled in some ropes, and he wound up dangling upside-down. As Simpson and his friends drive off in a convertible, he sees a police chase, and decides to follow, but changes his mind and refuses to do so.

Cast
Dabney Coleman as Burt Simpson
Matt Frewer as Ernie Dills
Teri Garr as Carolyn Simpson
Barry Corbin as Captain
Joe Pantoliano as Scalese
Xander Berkeley as Carl Stark
Kaj-Erik Eriksen as Dougie Simpson
 Rob Roy as Dan Miller
 Tony Pantages as Vito
 Kim Kondrashoff as Michael Lutz
 Paul Jarrett as Jonas Lutz
 Kevin McNulty as Dr. Drexler
 Paul Batten as Dr. Goldman
 Wes Tritter as Coffin Salesman

Home releases
The film was released on Region 2 DVD by Carlton International Media UK in 2002 and on Region 3 DVD in South Korea. It has only been released on VHS and Laserdisc by Live Home Video in the United States.

References

External links
 
 
 

1990 films
20th Century Fox films
1990 action comedy films
1990s crime comedy films
Films scored by Ira Newborn
Films set in Seattle
Films set in Washington (state)
Films shot in Washington (state)
Fictional portrayals of the Seattle Police Department
Films directed by Gregg Champion
1990s English-language films
American action comedy films
1990s American films